The 1950 North Texas State Eagles football team was an American football team that represented North Texas State College (now known as the University of North Texas) during the 1950 college football season as a member of the Gulf Coast Conference. In their 5th year under head coach Odus Mitchell, the team compiled a 7–2–1 record.

Schedule

References

North Texas State
North Texas Mean Green football seasons
North Texas State Eagles football